is a Japanese shōnen manga series by Tomoki Matsumo. After two pilot chapters published in 2008 and 2009, the series began publication in Square Enix's Gangan Joker magazine in 2009. and was compiled into six volumes. Soleil Productions licensed the series for publication in France.

Synopsis
While looking at the high school entrance exam results, Maki meets his future classmate Aikawa Kizuna, who he thinks is a beautiful woman but who turns out to really be a cross-dressing man.

Volumes
The series has been compiled into six tankōbon volumes.

References

External links
 

2009 manga
Cross-dressing in anime and manga
Manga series
Shōnen manga